Battista Berardi (28 February 1903 – 1968) was an Italian racing cyclist. He rode in the 1928 Tour de France.

References

1903 births
1968 deaths
Italian male cyclists
Place of birth missing